Chunky may refer to:


People
 Chunky Clements (born 1994), American football player
 Liam O'Brien (hurler) (born 1949), Irish hurler
 Chunky Pandey, stage name of Indian actor Suyash Pandey (born 1962)
 Chunky Woodward (1924–1990), Canadian retailer and rancher

Places
 Chunky, Mississippi, United States, a town
Chunky River, a tributary of the Chickasawhay River in Mississippi

Songs
 "Chunky" (Format B song), 2015
 "Chunky" (Bruno Mars song), 2016

Other uses
 Chunky, a candy bar
 Chunkey, a Native American game also spelled Chunky
 Chunky Kong, a character in the video game Donkey Kong 64
 Packed pixel or "chunky", a method of frame buffer organization in computer graphics

See also
 Chunk (disambiguation)

Lists of people by nickname